Loxa is an insect genus in the large family of shield bugs.  It occurs primarily in Central America and Mexico, but is also found in Texas, Florida and South America. While Loxa is a genus of the tribe Pentatomini, its species are similar in many respects to those in the Chlorocorini, specifically the genera: Chlorocoris Spinola, Chloropepla Stål, Mayrinia Horvath and Fecelia Stål. Some species of Loxa are minor crop pests, for example Loxa deducta.

Species include:
 Loxa deducta 
 Loxa flavicollis 
 Loxa haematica 
 Loxa peruviensis  
 Loxa planiceps  
 Loxa virescens  
 Loxa viridis

References

Pentatomidae genera
Hemiptera of Central America
Hemiptera of South America
Pentatomini